David van Embden (October 22, 1875, The Hague – February 14, 1962, Amsterdam), was a Dutch politician, first for the Free-thinking Democratic League (VDB), later for the Labour Party (Dutch: Partij van de Arbeid, PvdA).

He studied law at the municipal university of Amsterdam and in 1901, he graduated cum laude. Raised in the Portuguese Jewish community in the Netherlands, in 1905 he married a Christian. From 1905 to 1941 he was professor of economics and statistics at the municipal university of Amsterdam.

From 1905 he was a party worker for the VDB in the Dutch House of Representatives. From 1910 to 1916 he was a member of the States-Provincial of North Holland for the district of Amsterdam. From 1918 to 1946 he was member of the Senate. His sister was at that time also a member of parliament for the VDB.  His pacifism was strongly influenced by his religious convictions and he was a proponent of national disarmament. He also advocated decolonization, and progressive social and economic programs.

After the Germans invaded the Netherlands on May 10, 1940 in the Second World War, van Embden fled during the night of May 13–14, 1940 to the United Kingdom. After the war, in 1946, he returned to the Netherlands and joined the Labour Party (PvdA). He also became a member of the party's governing board for Amsterdam-East.

Embden also resumed his professorship.  Van Embden died in 1962.

References
Biographical Dictionary of the Netherlands - biography (in Dutch)
Parlement.com biography (in Dutch)

1875 births
1962 deaths
Converts to Protestantism from Judaism
Dutch economists
Dutch Jews
Jewish Dutch politicians
Dutch pacifists
Dutch refugees
Members of the Provincial Council of North Holland
Free-thinking Democratic League politicians
Jews who immigrated to the United Kingdom to escape Nazism
Labour Party (Netherlands) politicians
Members of the Senate (Netherlands)
Politicians from The Hague
Remonstrants
University of Amsterdam alumni
Academic staff of the University of Amsterdam